German submarine U-555 was a Type VIIC U-boat of Nazi Germany's Kriegsmarine during World War II. The submarine was laid down on 2 January 1940 at the Blohm & Voss yard in Hamburg as yard number 531, launched on 7 December 1940, and commissioned on 30 January 1941 under the command of Kapitänleutnant Hans-Joachim Horrer.

Design
German Type VIIC submarines were preceded by the shorter Type VIIB submarines. U-555 had a displacement of  when at the surface and  while submerged. She had two shafts and two  propellers.

U-555 was fitted with two  torpedo tubes at the bow, fourteen torpedoes, one  SK C/35 naval gun, 220 rounds, and a  C/30 anti-aircraft gun. The boat had a complement of between forty-four and sixty.

Service history
Initially attached to the 24th U-boat Flotilla, she was transferred to the 21st U-boat Flotilla based at Pillau (now Baltiysk, Russia) on 1 December 1942, and served throughout the war under a number of commanders as a training boat, seeing no combat service.

The U-boat was stricken in March 1945, and surrendered to the British on 3 May 1945. She was later broken up in 1946.

References

Bibliography

External links

World War II submarines of Germany
German Type VIIC submarines
U-boats commissioned in 1941
1940 ships
Ships built in Hamburg